John F. "Cinders" O'Brien AKA: Darby O'Brien (April 15, 1867 – March 11, 1892) was a Major League Baseball pitcher from  to . He played with the Cleveland Infants, Cleveland Spiders, and Boston Reds. He had a 3.68 ERA at the end of his career.

O'Brien died in his hometown of Troy, New York at the age of 24 of pneumonia.  He is interred at St. Patrick Cemetery in Watervliet, New York.

See also
 List of Major League Baseball annual saves leaders

References

External links

1867 births
1892 deaths
Major League Baseball pitchers
Baseball players from New York (state)
19th-century baseball players
Cleveland Infants players
Cleveland Spiders players
Deaths from pneumonia in New York (state)
Boston Reds (AA) players
Lima Lushers players
Cleveland Blues (1887–88) players